The Red Dirt Skinners are an Anglo-Canadian multi-genre duo, who formed in 2011. The duo consists of Rob and Sarah Skinner, both multi-instrumentalists originating from South East England and now residing in Ontario, Canada.

History
In 2012, the couple's home was the subject of a burglary. Home Sweet Home is a collection of songs written about the events of the weekend of the burglary.
.

In 2013, the Red Dirt Skinners became the first band in history to succeed at both the British Blues Awards (Winner Instrumentalist of the Year 2014, Runner-up 2013)) and the British Country Music Awards (Horizon Act of the year and People's Choice). Since then they have been nominated at the International Acoustic Music Awards.

The Red Dirt Skinners released Sinking The Mary Rose in 2013 and subsequently Live in Aberdeen in 2014.

In 2014, Sarah Skinner became the first female artist to be endorsed by Trevor James Saxophones. Sarah remained with Trevor James for 7 years before progressing to a solid copper Rampone and Cazzani soprano in early 2022.

Their fifth album, Behind The Wheel, was voted in several polls as Folk/Roots album of the Year in 2016. Behind The Wheel was released on 24 March 2016.

In 2017 Rob and Sarah Skinner were deemed to be "performers of a world class level" and were invited by Canadian immigration to become permanent residents of Canada. 

Their sixth album, Under Utopian Skies, was voted in several polls as Alternative album of the year in 2018.

In 2020, Rob Skinner became endorsed by Breedlove Guitars.

Their seventh album, Bear With Us was released on October 22 2021 to high acclaim

Influences
Supertramp, Roger Hodgson, Pink Floyd, Queen (band), David Bowie, The Civil Wars, Dream Theater.

Instrumentation
Rob Skinner – Lead vocalist, guitar, bass guitar, drums, percussion, keyboards
Sarah Skinner – Backing vocalist, saxophone (mainly soprano saxophone), harmonica, keyboards

Discography
2011 Grass Roots
2012 Home Sweet Home
2013 Sinking The Mary Rose
2014 Live in Aberdeen
2016 Behind The Wheel
2018 Under Utopian Skies
2021 Bear With Us

Awards and nominations

References

External links
Official Red Dirt Skinners website

English folk musical groups
English singer-songwriters
Musical groups established in 2011
2011 establishments in the United Kingdom
Folk music duos
Male–female musical duos
Married couples
Musical groups from South East England
Musical groups from Ontario